Kruthika Jayakumar is an Indian actress and classical dancer. She appears in South India films.Kruthika has worked in popular movies like Kavacha, Intlo Deyyam Nakem Bayam. Kruthika's previous film to hit the theatres was Kavacha in the year 2019.

Career

Kruthika Jayakumar hails from a Tamil speaking family in Bengaluru, Karnataka .Kruthika started practicing Bharatanatyam from age seven. She trained under Sri Mithun Shyam in Bangalore. She was performing at a show in Thiruvananthapuram when Malayalam film director Balu Kiriyath spotted her and convinced her to foray into cinema. She later auditioned and was selected for the role of Venkatesh Daggubati's daughter in Drushyam, a Telugu remake of Malayalam film Drishyam.

Filmography

References

External links
 

Living people
Actresses from Bangalore
Actresses in Telugu cinema
Indian film actresses
Actresses in Kannada cinema
21st-century Indian actresses
Bharatanatyam exponents
Indian female classical dancers
Performers of Indian classical dance
Dancers from Karnataka
Women artists from Karnataka
21st-century Indian dancers
21st-century Indian women artists
Actresses in Tamil cinema
1997 births